Rock Stream is a hamlet in the town of Starkey, Yates County, New York, United States. Rock Stream has a post office with ZIP code 14878, which opened on September 19, 1820.

References

Hamlets in Yates County, New York
Hamlets in New York (state)